Polish cuisine is a style of cooking and food preparation originating in or widely popular in Poland. Due to Poland's history, Polish cuisine has evolved over the centuries to be very eclectic, and it shares many similarities with other regional cuisines. Polish-styled cooking in other cultures is often referred to as à la polonaise.

Polish cuisine is rich in meat, especially pork, chicken and game, in addition to a wide range of vegetables, spices, mushrooms, and herbs. It is also characteristic in its use of various kinds of noodles, cereals, and grains. In general, Polish cuisine is hearty and heavy in its use of butter, cream, eggs, and extensive seasoning. The traditional dishes are often demanding in preparation. Many Poles allow themselves a generous amount of time to serve and enjoy their festive meals, especially Christmas Eve supper on December 24, or Easter breakfast, both of which could take a number of days to prepare in their entirety.

A traditional Polish dinner is composed of three courses, beginning with a soup like the popular  broth and tomato soup. At restaurants, the soups are followed by an appetizer such as herring (prepared in either cream, oil, or in aspic), or other cured meats and vegetable salads. The main course usually includes a serving of meat, such as roast, breaded pork cutlet, or chicken, with a coleslaw-like , shredded root vegetables with lemon and sugar (carrot, celeriac, seared beetroot), sauerkraut, or  salad. The side dishes are usually boiled potatoes, or less commonly, rice.

Internationally, if a Polish culinary tradition is used in other cuisines, it is referred to as à la polonaise, from French meaning 'Polish-style.' In French cooking, this term is used for techniques like using butter instead of cooking oil; frying vegetables with buttered breadcrumbs; using minced parsley and boiled eggs (Polonaise garnish); and adding horseradish, lemon juice, or sour cream to sauces like velouté.

History

Middle Ages

Polish cuisine in the Middle Ages was based on dishes made of agricultural produce and cereal crops (millet, rye, wheat), meats of wild and farm animals, fruits, forest berries and game, honey, herbs, and local spices. It was known above all for abundant use of salt from Wieliczka and permanent presence of groats. A high calorific value of dishes and drinking beer or mead as a basic drink was typical of Middle Ages Polish cuisine.

During the Middle Ages the cuisine of Poland was heavy and spicy. Two main ingredients were meat (both game and beef) and cereal. The latter consisted initially of proso millet, but later in the Middle Ages other types of cereal became widely used. Apart from cereals, a large portion of the daily diet of mediaeval Poles consisted of beans, mostly broad beans and peas. As the territory of Poland was densely forested, usage of mushrooms, forest berries, nuts, and wild honey was also widespread. Among the delicacies of the Polish nobility were honey-braised bear paws served with horseradish-flavoured salad, smoked bear tongue, and bear bacon (bears are now protected in Poland).

Thanks to close trade relations with Turkey and the countries in the Caucasus, the price of spices (such as black pepper and nutmeg) was much lower in Poland than the rest of Europe, hence spicy sauces became popular.

The daily beverages included milk, whey, buttermilk, and various herb infusions. The most popular alcoholic beverages were beer and mead; however, in the 16th century, upper classes began to import Hungarian and Silesian wines. Mead was so widespread that in the 13th century Prince Leszek I the White explained to the Pope that Polish knights could not participate in a crusade as there was no mead in the Holy Land. Also, vodka became popular, possibly among the lower classes first. There is written evidence suggesting that vodka originated in Poland. At that time, the word  (vodka) referred to chemical compounds such as medicines and cosmetic cleansers, while the popular beverage was called   (from the Old Polish ).

Renaissance
Along with the Italian queen Bona Sforza (second wife of Sigismund I of Poland), many Italian cooks came to Poland after 1518. Although native vegetable foods were an ancient and intrinsic part of Polish cuisine, this began a period in which vegetables like lettuce, leeks, celeriac, and cabbage were more widely used. During this period, the use of spices—which arrived in Poland via Western Asian trade routes—was common among those who could afford them, and dishes considered elegant could be very spicy. However, the idea that Queen Bona was the first to introduce vegetables to Poland is false. While her southern cooks may have helped elevate and expand the role of various vegetables in royal Polish cuisine, records show that the court of king Jogaila (who died in 1434, over 80 years before her reign) enjoyed a variety of vegetables including lettuce, beets, cabbage, turnip, carrots, peas, and cauliflower.

Polish-style pickled cucumber is a variety developed in the northern part of Central Europe. It has been exported worldwide and is found in the cuisines of many countries. It is usually preserved in wooden barrels. A cucumber only pickled for a few days is different in taste (less sour) than one pickled for a longer time and is called .

The only indisputable fact is that the court of Queen Bona was fed in an Italian fashion, because she exclusively employed Italian cooks, some of whom were originally hired to prepare parties for aristocratic families but who were soon serving typical Italian dishes as part of the court's daily menus. Court records show that Queen Bona imported large volumes of southern European, American, and Western Asian fruits (oranges, lemons, pomegranates, olives, figs, tomatoes), vegetables (potatoes and corn), nuts (chestnuts, raisins, and almonds, including marzipan), along with grains (such as rice), cane sugar, and Italian olive oil. The court also imported various herbs and spices including black pepper, fennel, saffron, ginger, nutmeg, cloves, and cinnamon.

The Polish–Lithuanian Commonwealth

Until the Partitions perpetrated by the neighboring empires, Poland was one of the largest countries in the world, and encompassed many regions with its own, distinctive culinary traditions. Two consecutive Polish kings, Władysław IV and John II Casimir married the same French Duchess, Marie Louise Gonzaga, daughter of Charles I, Duke of Mantua; she was persecuted by King Louis XIII of France for her affiance to his opponent Gaston, Duke of Orléans. Marie Louise arrived in Warsaw in 1646, was widowed, and married again in 1649. Ludwika brought along with her a court full of Frenchmen including courtiers, secretaries, army officers, physicians, merchants, craftsmen, as well as many cooks.

Records show that her visiting guests were entertained with forest game, fowl (waxwings, fieldfares, snow bunting, hazel grouse, partridges, black grouse, capercaillies), fish and mollusks (loach, various trout, grayling, fresh and smoked salmon, flounder, salted herring, lampreys in vinegar, oysters, snails), and Genoese pâté, not to mention fresh fruit and chestnuts. French and Italian wines were served, as well as mead and local beers. The dishes were made only according to French recipes. The royal court, with all its innovations, exerted a broad influence over the rest of aristocratic residences and noble palaces across Poland. French cuisine was in fashion and many families willingly employed French cooks and pâté makers. In the mid-18th century, French champagne appeared on Polish tables.

Among the most influential cuisines under the Polish–Lithuanian Commonwealth were Lithuanian, Jewish, German, and Hungarian cuisine, as well as Armenian cuisine, which arrived in Poland before the 17th century along with many settlers, especially in the south-eastern part of the Commonwealth. Signature dishes of the Western Asia reached Polish tables thanks to the Armenian trade and cultural exchange with Poland's neighbor: the Ottoman Empire. Rare delicacies were brought to royal court as gifts from sultans and royal envoys. The strongest influences were noted in the cities of Lwów, Kraków, Kamieniec Podolski, and Zamość due to many Armenians living there permanently. Also, because of the close contact with the Ottoman Empire, coffee and boza became popular.

With the subsequent decline of Poland, and the grain production crisis that followed The Deluge, potatoes began to replace the traditional use of cereal. The oldest surviving Polish cookbook, Compendium ferculorum, albo Zebranie potraw ("Collection of Dishes") by Stanisław Czerniecki was published in Kraków in 1682. Under the Partitions, the cuisine of Poland became heavily influenced by cuisines of the surrounding empires. This included Russian and German cuisines, but also the culinary traditions of most nations of the Austro-Hungarian empire. The 19th century also saw the creation of many Polish cookbooks, by Jan Szyttler, Anna Ciundziewicka, Wincenta Zawadzka, Lucyna Ćwierczakiewiczowa, and others.

After World War II

After the end of World War II, Poland became a communist country which joined the Warsaw Pact. Some restaurants were nationalized. The communists envisioned a net of lunch rooms called "bufet" for the workers at various companies, and milk bars for the public. The majority of restaurants that survived the 1940s and 1950s were state-owned. Workplace lunch rooms promoted mostly inexpensive meals, including many soups, meatballs and pork chops, and staples such as  /  (potato pancakes),  (apple pancakes),  (potato gnocchi),  (farmer's cheese gnocchi served sweet), and pierogi. The popular Polish  is a breaded cutlet similar to the Austrian Wiener schnitzel and the Italian and Spanish Milanesa.

With time, the shortage economy led to scarcity of meat, coffee, tea, and other basic ingredients. Many products like chocolate, sugar, and meat were rationed, with a specific limit depending on social class and health requirements. Physical workers and pregnant women were generally entitled to more food products. Imports were restricted, so much of the food supply was domestic. Cuisine became homogeneous, to be a chef was no longer a prestigious profession, and for decades the country became basically disconnected from any foreign cuisine. Tropical fruits (such as citrus, banana, and pineapple) were available during holidays, while local fruits and vegetables were mostly seasonal but were available at private stands. For most of the year, people had to get by with only domestic winter fruit and vegetables: apples, plums, currants, onions, potatoes, cabbage, root vegetables, and frozen products. Other food products (of foreign origins) were available at markets at high prices.

This situation led in turn to gradual replacement of traditional Polish cuisine with food prepared from anything available at the moment. The traditional recipes were mostly preserved during the  feast (Christmas Eve), for which many families tried to prepare 12 traditional courses.

A popular form of fish dish was, and still is, the paprikash from the port city of Szczecin, usually added to sandwiches as a spread.

Modern era
With the fall of communism in Poland in 1989, a wave of new restaurants opened, and the basic foodstuffs were once again easily obtainable. This led to a gradual return of rich traditional Polish cuisine, both in home cooking and in restaurants. At the same time, restaurants and supermarkets promoted the use of ingredients typical of other cuisines of the world. Among the most notable foods that started to become common in Poland were cucurbits, zucchini, and many kinds of fish. During communist times, fresh fish was available essentially only in the seaside regions.

Recent years have seen the advent of a slow food movement, and a number of TV programs devoted to cuisine, both traditional and otherwise, have gained popularity. In 2011, a nostalgic cookbook (written in English) combining a child's memories growing up in the Gierek era with traditional Polish recipes was published in London.

American food in Poland, most commonly McDonald's, KFC, and Pizza Hut, are declining in popularity as Polish people prefer their own cuisine, including fast food. Meanwhile, doner kebabs are gaining popularity. There are also many small-scale, quick-service restaurants which serve kebabs, hamburgers, hot dogs, and Polish  (sausage). In the southern mountainous region,  served with cranberry jam is a popular street food.

Holiday meals

Christmas dishes

Traditionally, carp (fried or Jewish style) provides a main component of the Christmas Eve meal across Poland. Other popular dishes, eaten the next day, include pickled matjas herring, rollmops, pierogi with sauerkraut and forest mushrooms, fish soup, kielbasa, hams, bigos (savory stew of cabbage and meat), and vegetable salads.

Fat Thursday

, or "Fat Thursday", is a Polish culinary custom on the last Thursday before Lent, equivalent to Pancake Day. Traditionally, it is an occasion to enjoy sweets and cakes before the forty days of abstinence expected of Catholics until Easter Day.

Traditional Polish doughnuts are filled with rose petal jam, plum jam, or apple and covered with icing with orange peel or powdered with icing sugar.

Only later were they made as patisserie.

Easter breakfast

Regional cuisines
Poland has a number of unique regional cuisines with regional differences in preparations and ingredients. For an extensive list of the dishes typical to Galicia, Kresy, Podlachia, Masovia (including Warsaw), Masuria, Pomerania, Silesia, Lesser Poland, the Tatra mountains, and Greater Poland, see the List of Polish cuisine dishes.

Greater Poland
Typical for Greater Poland are various dishes from potatoes – especially pyry z gzikiem (potatoes with quark cheese mixed with sour cream, onions and chieves). Popular are also poultry dishes like kaczka po poznańsku (duck meat with red cabbage and steam-cooked dumplings), czernina (duck blood soup) and goose meat eaten on the on the Saint Martin's Day.

Other famous products include also rogale świętomarcińskie (croissants filled with white poppy seeds), fried cheese and a beer Grodziskie/Grätzer (made from oak-smoked wheat malt and with a low alcohol content).

Lesser Poland
The city of Kraków is famous for its sausage kiełbasa krakowska and meat sandwich maczanka krakowska. Typical are also some Austrian influences due to the fact, that the city belonged in the second half of the 19th century and at the beginning of the 20th century to Austria-Hungary. They include Pischinger cake and pork cutlet kotlet schabowy (today popular in the whole Poland). Popular street foods are bagels obwarzanki and baked sandwiches zapiekanki sold on the Plac Nowy square.

The area near Nowy Sącz and Limanowa is rich in quality plums; popular are dried ones called suska sechlońska and plum brandy slivovitz.

The mountain areas of Lesser Poland, especially Podhale, are famous for its sheep milk cheeses like bundz, creamy bryndza or smoked oscypek. Other popular dishes include a milk drink żętyca, a sauerkraut soup kwaśnica, placek po zbójnicku (potato pancakes with goulash on top) and a góral tea (tea with alcohol).

Lubelszczyzna
Many dishes in Lublin cuisine have Jewish roots, like cebularz (flatbread topped with onion and poppy seads) and forszmak (soup with various types of meat).

Important local ingredient is groat – typical dish consisting of it is a pie called pieróg biłgorajski.

Kashubia and Pomerania
Because of the proximity to the sea, typical for the region are various forms of fish dishes like śledź po kaszubsku (herring in tomato marinade with onion) and fried cod or flounder.

Other famous products include kashubian strawberry (kaszëbskô malëna), gingerbreads from Toruń and alcohol beverages from Gdańsk: Goldwasser (herbal liqueur with flakes of gold leaf) and machandel (juniper vodka).

In Szczecin, typical regional products are paszteciki (pastries with meat or vegetarian filling) and fish spread paprykarz szczeciński.

Masovia
Modern Warsaw, as a capital, has a very cosmopolitan cuisine combining various international foods. However, there are also some typical traditional dishes like Warsaw tripe, pyzy z mięsem (potato dumpling with meat) and pork knuckles in jelly (popular as a vodka chaser).

Famous are many desserts of Warsaw origin, like chocolate cream cake wuzetka (probably named after the Warsaw W-Z Route), ptasie mleczko (chocolate covered marshmallows) and pańska skórka (candies sold traditionally at cemeteries during the All Saints' Day).

Out of Warsaw, typical regional products include apples from Grójec and piwo kozicowe from Kurpie region (low-alcohol juniper beverage).

Podlachia
Podlachian cuisine has many Lithuanian, Belarussian and Tatar influences. Popular dishes, also known from the aforementioned cuisines, include kartacze (potato dumplings with meat), babka ziemniaczana (potato pie) and pierekaczewnik (meat pie).

Besides, famous are cold beet or cucumber soup chłodnik, cheese koryciński and desserts: sękacz (spit cake) and marcinek (layer cake with cream).

Podlasie is also known from high-quality alcoholic beverages like vodka with bison grass żubrówka and home-made strong vodka duch puszczy.

Silesia
Silesian cuisine combines Polish, German, Czech and Austrian influences. The most iconic dish is rolada – rolled beef patty usually served with silesian dumplings and red cabbage. Other popular foods are sourdough soup żur śląski, meatballs karminadle and blood sausage krupniok.

Typical desserts are cake kołocz śląski, candies kopalnioki and wafers oblaty śląskie.

Traditional dishes from Lower Silesia include śląskie niebo (pork with dried fruits and spices), herbal liquer Echt Stonsdorfer (today produced in Germany, but similar product known as Likier Karkonoski is produced in Poland) and modern fast-food from Wrocław – knysza.

Warmia–Masuria
Cuisine of Warmia–Masuria connects German and Eastern influences (especially from the former Eastern Borderlands; thus it has some similarities to the Podlachian cuisine). Due to many lakes and forests, it is also rich in fishes, mushrooms, and honey. Typical traditional dishes include kartacze (potato dumplings with meat), dzyndzałki (dumplings filled with buckwheat groats), klopsy królewieckie (metaballs with caper sauce), sękacz (spit cake) and a honey liqueur niedźwiedziówka.

Soups

All soups have fresh stock—made from chicken, beef, pork ribs, vegetables, or a combination of several—combined with root vegetables. Meat is either chopped and eaten with soup, used to make the next dish, or eaten alone with bread. It is common to eat two dishes during dinner: (1) a soup, and (2) a starch (potato, rice, groats, pasta) with meat, stews, or sweet dishes. Although cream or purée soups are not common or traditional in Poland, they are still prepared because of the influence of other countries' cuisine. Often soups are whitened by adding a splash of sour or double cream.

Thin tomato soup made with tomato purée, root vegetables, and stock, usually served with pasta or rice; sour cream is often added.
Potato soup with root vegetables.
 (or )Duck soup made with duck broth or duck blood, the latter giving the soup a dark, almost black, colour. Recipes vary widely, but often sweet and sour ingredients are added, typically vinegar and often sugar, fruit juice, or fruit such as prunes or pears. It is usually served with the duck meat and Kluski-style noodles. Nowadays, it is not commonly eaten.
Cold soup made of soured milk or sour cream, young beet leaves, cucumbers, and chopped fresh dill. Sometimes chives and radishes are added.
Beet leaves soup with potatoes and root vegetables, served hot.
 (red borscht)Clear beetroot soup made out of stock, beetroots, and beetroot sourdough; served with uszka, krokiet made from naleśniki, pasztecik, pierogi, and rarely with white beans, red kidney beans, or mashed potatoes. It is a very important dish during Christmas Eve.
Beetroot soup with grated beetroots, cubed potatoes, and root vegetables. Sometimes it is called "red borscht", like the one cooked during Christmas Eve, even though it does not contain beetroot sourdough. It is slightly sweet but not sour.
 (Ukrainian borscht)Beetroot soup with addition of sliced white cabbage, white or red kidney beans, and diced or puréed tomatoes. In Ukraine, beans are not used in this dish.
Sorrel soup made of sorrel leaves and rice, served with hard-boiled egg.
 (or )Beef or pork tripe stew with marjoram and spices. Vegetarians make this soup with oyster mushrooms.
Clear chicken soup served with noodles, usually short vermicelli. The stock is made of root vegetables and whole chicken, beef, or both.
Mushroom soup made of white or wild mushrooms with potatoes or pasta. During Christmas Eve it is instead served with łazanki pasta or uszka.
A sour cucumber soup made of sour, salted cucumbers.
Fermented cereal soup made of wholemeal rye sourdough, although oat sourdough is used in Lesser Poland and Podlachia, and buckwheat sourdough is used in Lublin Voivodeship.
Fermented cereal soup, more delicate than  because it is made of wheat flour sourdough. Colloquially (but improperly) it is often called  (white bortscht).
 (rye soup)Fermented cereal soup made with sour rye. Served with sliced smoked pork sausage, cooked and smoked bacon, and separately cooked and diced potatoes.
Fermented cereal soup made with wheat flour. Traditionally, cabbage sourdough (sauerkraut juice) or cucumber sourdough (sour pickled cucumbers juice) is used. Still, they can be replaced by using citric acid.
Pea soup with split peas, potato, carrot, parsley root, kielbasa or fried bacon, and marjoram.
Sauerkraut soup with potatoes, root vegetables (parsley root, carrots, celery root), bacon, and pork ribs. 
Sauerkraut soup with potatoes and ribs.
Pork or beef, smoked bacon, white mushrooms, sour pickled cucumbers, red bell pepper, tomato puree, spices, onion, and garlic.
Cold soup made of raw, partially blended, or cooked and chilled vegetables with yoghurt or sour cream (such as cucumber  or tomato ). Often served with cooked potatoes, hard-boiled eggs, or both.
 (bean soup)Made with white beans, root vegetables, smoked sausage (kielbasa), fried bacon, and marjoram.
 (cabbage soup)Made with stock, chopped white cabbage, root vegetables, tomato puree and potatoes.
 (vegetable soup)Made with potatoes, green beans, root vegetables, cauliflower, peas, and sometimes brussels sprouts.
 (rice soup)Made with rice, potatoes, and root vegetables with chicken.
 (dill soup)Made with chicken stock, root vegetables, a big amount of dill, spring onion, potatoes or baby potatoes, and sometimes with sour or double cream.
 (horseradish soup)Made with white kielbasa, smoked bacon or pork ribs, sour cream, horseradish, garlic, potatoes, and root vegetables for stock; can be served with hard-boiled eggs.
Soup with minced meat, cabbage, tomato puree, tomatoes, rice, and spices.
 (Mexican soup)Made with minced pork or beef, garlic, red kidney beans, corn kernels, canned tomatoes, tomato puree, and onion. Potatoes and root vegetables may be added or not.
 (cauliflower soup)Made with stock, potatoes, cauliflower florets, and root vegetables.
 (broccoli soup)Made with stock, potatoes, broccoli florets, and root vegetables.
 (goulash soup)Made with pork, beef, potatoes, onion or leek, passata, tomato puree, paprika, and red bell pepper.
 (or ) (lentil soup)Made with green or red lentils, garlic, tomatoes, tomato puree, onion, and double or sour cream. May be served with pasta or potatoes.
 (fruit soup)Served cold with different fruits and pasta during hot summer.

Meat and fish

 
Roasted, stewed, or grilled mutton.
Stew of mainly sauerkraut, cabbage, and meats such as smoked kielbasa and bacon. Also contains mushrooms, onions, and sometimes tomato puree. It is known as a "hunter's stew" due to the addition of game and scraps of other meats.
Thin slices of beef braised with mushrooms.
Thin slices of pork in gravy, braised with onions.
Stewed pork knuckle or hock.
Cabbage rolls with ground meat and rice or groats, served with mushroom, dill, or tomato sauce. For Christmas Eve, meat may be substituted with mushrooms. A variety with mushroom and potato filling is mostly found in Eastern Poland due to influence from Ukraine. Cabbage leaves used are from savoy cabbage or white cabbage. Rarely, it can be made with red cabbage or sauerkraut leaves. Modern versions include use of chinese cabbage or filling wrapped in zucchini slices. This dish is either cooked or baked.
 ( without wrapping)Large meatballs filled with chopped cabbage, onion and rice.
Meat stew originated from Hungarian  with onions, tomatoes, red bell peppers, and paprika.
Pork neck, roasted, grilled, or braised with onions.
Sausage, smoked or boiled, usually made with pork. It is a staple of Polish cuisine and comes in dozens of varieties.
Minced meat (pork, pork-beef, or turkey) patty made with egg, breadcrumbs, chopped onions, wet bread, and spices, often rolled in breadcrumbs. Sometimes filled with cheese, mushrooms, or both.
Thinly pounded pork loin cutlet coated in breadcrumbs. It is a variation of schnitzel.
Roasted chicken.
Roasted veal.
Roasted pork in wine gravy.
Braised beef sirloin slices.
Polish style meatballs in tomato, mushroom, or dill sauce.
Minced meat roulade with mushrooms.
Stuffed pork loin.
Roasted beef.
Thin beef fillets rolled and filled with bacon, mushrooms, mustard, gherkins, and onions.
Thin pork/chicken fillets rolled with filling including version with cheese.
Smoked spare ribs.
Cod fillet with or without batter. Can be steam cooked or baked.
Steamed or baked salmon fillet.
Poached or baked trout.
Rolled pickled herring fillets stuffed with pickled onion or cucumbers.
Fried breaded fish fillet.
Herring marinated in oil or vinegar with onions.
Herring marinated in sour cream with onions. Sour pickled cucumbers, apples, and mushrooms can also be added.
Polish savoury jelly based on bone broth made from pork legs and served with chopped meat and vegetables, like peas or carrots. Served with a drizzle of vinegar or lemon juice. Dish originates from Jewish cuisine. If using meat other than pork leg, it is called .

Flour or potato-based
Half-moon-shaped dumplings with various fillings. Savoury pierogi may be filled with sauerkraut and mushrooms, potato, quark and fried onion (Ruthenian ), minced meat, or buckwheat groats and quark or mushrooms. Sweet pierogi can be made with sweet quark or with fruits such as blueberries, strawberries, cherries, plums, raspberries, apples, or even chocolate.
Tiny dumplings traditionally filled only with mushrooms and onions. Other fillings used are mushrooms with sauerkraut or rarely cooked and minced meat with onions. When filled with meat, they are served with clear borscht, clear mushroom soup, or broth.
Stuffed dumplings with raw minced beef and mutton, beef dripping, fried onions, and spices.
Potato pancakes with grated potatoes, onions, eggs, wheat flour, and marjoram.
Potato dumplings made with raw, grated potatoes, egg, flour, and sometimes filled with minced meat; then cooked.
Potato dumplings made with cooked potatoes and starch. Usually filled with fruits, most popular being plums and strawberries.
Hoof-shaped potato dumplings made of cooked potatoes, egg, and flour. Often served with breadcrumbs, sugar, and melted butter or fried bacon.
Hoof-shaped dumplings made of flour or potatoes, eggs, and quark.
Dumplings in small donut-like shape made with boiled potatoes and potato starch. Often served with gravy or meat stew.
Dumplings black or gray in colour, made of raw grated potatoes and potato starch.
Steamed yeast wheat flour dumplings served with fruit yoghurt or jam. They can be also served savoury with gravy or filled with chocolate.
 (laid dumplings)Dumplings made of thick batter with flour and eggs laid in boiling water.
 (poured dumplings)Dumplings made of thin batter with flour, milk, and eggs, usually poured straight into soup.
 (grated dumplings)Grated or chopped dough into tiny balls and cooked.
Thicker and plumper version of crêpes, served with sweet or savoury filling.
Commonly served with clear borscht.
Yeast pancakes often stuffed with apples and served with powdered sugar or jam.
Pasta shaped like small squares. This Polish version is served with sauerkraut, onion, and fried kielbasa or fried bacon.
Open faced sandwich made from a veka roll sliced in half and topped with tomato sauce, mushrooms, and cheese.  can also be anything baked in casserole dish with added egg and cream mixture, so it holds together when removed. It usually involves meats, vegetables with potatoes or pasta, and melted cheese on top. A baked Polish fast food.
Polish fast food with yeast bread roll filled with red and white cabbage, tomato, cucumber, pickled cucumber, onion, fried onion, corn, and sometimes fried chicken with garlic mayonnaise sauce. It originated in Wrocław.
Fried slices of potatoes (often previously cooked) usually (1) eaten with a fried egg, (2) mixed in scrambled eggs, onions, and grilled, or (3) mixed with fried, sliced kielbasa. Whole dish and serving with eggs or sausage comes from Germany. In Poland, it is often eaten with a glass of sour buttermilk or kefir.
Fried (cooked) pasta with fried onions, scrambled eggs, and butter; sometimes cheese, bacon, or ham can be added. It is a version of Italian spaghetti carbonara.

Side dishes and salads
Cooked groats; most popular are groats of buckwheat, barley, millet, and wheat.
Traditional Polish salad made with sliced cucumbers, sour cream, and spices; served as a side.
Carrot salad made with peeled and grated carrots, apples, oil, and lemon juice.
Salad made with cucumbers, tomatoes, onions, and oil or sour cream.
Simple boiled potatoes sprinkled with dill.
Mashed potatoes.
Salad with shredded cabbage, carrots, and spices, often with grated apples.
Salad with sauerkraut, carrots, parsley, apples, and lemon juice.
 or Salad of cooked vegetables such as parsley root, carrot, potatoes, celery root, pickled cucumbers in brine, and hard-cooked eggs in mayonnaise and mustard. Also often contains corn, peas, apple, onion, leek, or even red kidney beans. A traditional Polish side dish.
Sauerkraut or white cabbage pan-fried with onions and spices, often with fried bacon.
Braised white cabbage with onions, dill, and double cream.
Any salad made of raw vegetables with drizzle of vinegar, oil, sour cream, or yoghurt.
Any salad made of cooked vegetables, usually with mayonnaise.
Cooked and grated beetroot salad; can be made warm or cold.
Cooked and grated beetroots with horseradish paste and lemon juice.
Green beans with garlic and butter or oil; originated in Italy.
Cooked cauliflower, green beans, or Brussels sprouts with a polonaise sauce made of fried breadcrumbs in butter.
Cooked broccoli or cauliflower with a garlic sauce.
Polish pickled cucumber, fermented in brine consisting of dill and dill flower, garlic, salt, and spices.
Pickled cucumber in vinegar, which is rather sweet and vinegary in taste.
Marinated mushrooms.
Preserved salad made with cucumbers, onions, carrots, vinegar, and spices.
Potato salad made with cooked potatoes, onions, pickled cucumbers, dill, and mayonnaise; sometimes with added smoked bacon or herring fillets marinated in oil or vinegar. Originally from Germany.
Marinated herring salad with pickled cucumbers, onions, and sour cream; sometimes eggs and apples are added.

Bread

Bread and bread rolls ( (bread roll)) have been an essential part of Polish cuisine and tradition for centuries. Today, bread remains one of the most important foods in the Polish cuisine. The main ingredient for Polish bread is rye or wheat. Traditional bread has a crunchy crust, a soft interior, and an unforgettable aroma. Such bread is made with sourdough, which lends it a distinctive taste. It can be stored for a week or so without getting too hard and is not crumbly when cut.

In Poland, welcoming with bread and salt ("") is often associated with the traditional hospitality ("") of the Polish nobility, who prided themselves on their hospitality. A 17th-century Polish poet, Wespazjan Kochowski, wrote in 1674: "O good bread, when it is given to guests with salt and good will!" Another poet, Wacław Potocki, mentioned this custom. The custom was, however, not limited to the nobility, as Polish people of all classes observed this tradition, reflected in old Polish proverbs. Nowadays, the tradition is mainly observed on wedding days, when newlyweds are greeted with bread and salt by their parents on returning from the church wedding.

Desserts and sweets

Type of sweet meringue in biscuit form, occasionally with topping. 
Sweet poppy-seed swiss roll, with raisins, dried fruits, and walnuts.
Closed donuts filled with rose petal jam, other fruit conserves, custard, chocolate, or quark with sugar.
 (cheesecake)One of the most popular desserts in Poland. It can be baked or refrigerated. It might be flavoured with vanilla, lemon peel, or orange peel. Sometimes raisins or various fresh fruits are added. Commonly topped with a chocolate topping or sprinkled with coconut-flakes or nuts. It is very popular to garnish it with a sweet jelly topping with a variety of fresh fruits when it is unbaked.
Pie baked particularly at Christmas Eve and Easter, made with shortcrust pastry. There are variations with different fillings, such as walnut paste, dulce de leche or ganache with dried fruits, candied fruit, and nuts.
Sweet white wheat bread of Jewish origin.
 (eggnog)Made from egg yolks, sugar, and flavourings such as honey, vanilla, or cocoa. Traditional for Polish Jews.
Polish fudge; soft milk toffee candies.
Polish type of cream pie made of two layers of puff pastry, filled with vanilla pastry cream, usually sprinkled with powdered sugar. A close relative of the French millefeuille.
Cake with candied and dried fruit.
Polish version of a pound cake, made with or without yeast. It is served with powdered sugar or icing. Can be made as a marble cake.
Layered honey cake filled with vanilla pastry cream and ganache on top.
Carrot cake with added nuts and honey, sometimes layered with whipped cream.
Various types of unbaked and refrigerated cakes made of biscuits, ladyfingers, crackers, or sponge cake with vanilla, whipped cream, coconut, jelly, mascarpone, semolina, or poppy seed filling. Often topped with ganache.
Cream pie made of two layers of choux pastry filled with vanilla pastry cream.
Layered chocolate sponge cake filled with jam and whipped cream, associated with Warsaw. 
Chocolate-covered candy filled with soft meringue (or milk soufflé).
Clear, jelly-like sweet fruit liquid, made with starch, sugar, and fruits or fruit juice.
Pudding that usually comes in many different flavours, such as sweet cream, vanilla, chocolate, cherry, and more.
Light fried pastry covered with powdered sugar.
Grain dish made with wheat, poppy seeds, nuts, raisins, and honey. Not traditionally Polish, but served during Christmas in the eastern regions like Białystok and Podlachia.
 - Polish chocolate bar.
Assorted chocolate covered candy.
Large, circular, chocolate covered wafer with hand-made decorations.
Chocolate bar with a flavoured filling, most popular contains advocaat.
Chocolate-covered prune.
Type of a rice pudding baked or cooked with apples and cinnamon.

Beverages

Alcoholic
Traditional Polish alcoholic beverages include mead, beer, vodka (Old Polish:), and to a lesser extent, wine. In recent decades, beer has become very common, while wine is less frequently drunk; however, in recent years, the consumption of wine has risen along with increasing production of local grape wines in small vineyards in Lesser Poland, Subcarpathia, Silesia, and West Pomerania regions. Among alcoholic beverages, Polish vodka—traditionally prepared from grain or potatoes—has essentially displaced the formerly widespread mead.

Some sources suggest that the first production of vodka took place in Poland as early as the 8th century, becoming more widespread in the 11th century. The world's first written mention of the drink and of the word "vodka" was in 1405 from  recorder of deeds, the court documents from the Palatinate of Sandomierz in Poland.

Vodka production on a much larger scale began in Poland at the end of the 16th century. By the 17th and 18th centuries, Polish vodka was known in the Netherlands, Denmark, England, Russia, Germany, Austria, Hungary, Romania, Ukraine, Bulgaria, and the Black Sea basin. Vodka was the most popular alcoholic drink in Poland until 1998, when it was surpassed by beer.

Besides clear vodkas, flavoured vodka (known as nalewka) and liqueurs are also popular. The most important are Żubrówka (vodka with bison grass from Podlasie), herbal Żołądkowa Gorzka, aged , plum brandy  (especially from Łącko), honey liqueur , as well as Goldwasser (herbal liqueur with flakes of gold leaf) and juniper vodka , both originating from Gdańsk.

Non-alcoholic

Traditionally, kvass was a fermented beverage first popular among the peasantry, but it later spread to the szlachta and become a universal Polish drink by the 14th-15th centuries. It is typically made from rye bread, usually known as black bread, and is not classified as an alcoholic beverage in Poland, as its alcohol content usually ranges from 0% to 2%. There are many commercial and family variations of the beverage; however, traditional Polish recipes still exist. Despite its production on an industrial scale in Poland during the interbellum, it began to lose popularity to mass-produced soft drinks and carbonated water in the 20th century. It remained known primarily in rural areas of eastern Poland. However, kvass started making a comeback in the 21st century, with many new Polish brands being started.

In contemporary times, tea is perhaps the most popular drink, usually served with a slice of lemon and sweetened with either sugar or honey. Tea came to Poland from England shortly after its appearance in Western Europe, mainly due to the Dutch merchants. However, its prevalence is attributed to the Russians in the 19th century – at this time samovars imported from Russia become commonplace in Polish homes. Tea with milk is called .

Coffee has been widely drunk since the 18th century, when Poland bordered the Ottoman Empire.

Other frequently consumed beverages also include: buttermilk, kefir, soured milk, instant coffee, various mineral waters, juices, and numerous brands of soft drink. A considerable number of Poles enjoy carbonated water, and customers in restaurants are always offered both still and sparkling (carbonated) water to drink.

Lists of common Polish dishes found on a national level
 List of common Polish soups
 Common main courses
 Common desserts
 Common beverages
 Common folk medicine

See also
 List of Polish desserts
 List of Polish dishes

References

External links

 Polish traditional meals with video recipes
 Short summary of the Polish Cuisine
 Polish Cuisine on Culture.pl